Tum Airport  is an airport in southwestern Ethiopia. It serves the villages of Tum and Maji, the administrative center of the Maji District. The airport was formerly served by Ethiopian Airlines.

The plateau runs west through southeast of the airport. The runway slopes uphill to the southeast.

See also

Transport in Ethiopia
List of airports in Ethiopia

References

External links
OpenStreetMap - Tum Airport

Google Earth

Airports in Ethiopia